The following is a list of some notable phonologists (scholars in the field of phonology).

 Diana Archangeli
 Álvaro Arias
 Jan Baudouin de Courtenay
 Hans Basbøll
 Mary Beckman
 Leonard Bloomfield
 Franz Boas
 Diane Brentari
 Catherine Browman 
 Noam Chomsky
 George N. Clements
 Jennifer S. Cole 
 Laura J. Downing 
 John Rupert Firth
 Paula Fikkert
 John Goldsmith
 Mark Hale
 Morris Halle
 Bruce Hayes
 Joan B. Hooper
 Larry M. Hyman
 Sharon Inkelas
 Junko Itō
 Roman Jakobson
 Daniel Jones
 René Kager
 Ellen Kaisse
 Jonathan Kaye
 Michael Kenstowicz
 Paul Kiparsky
 Mikołaj Kruszewski
 Jerzy Kuryłowicz
 Aditi Lahiri
 André Martinet
 John McCarthy
 David Odden
 Marc van Oostendorp
 Janet Pierrehumbert
 Kenneth Pike
 Alan Prince
 Charles Reiss
 Keren Rice
 Jerzy Rubach
 Wendy Sandler
 Edward Sapir
 Ferdinand de Saussure
 Elisabeth Selkirk 
 Sibawayh
 Paul Smolensky
 Donca Steriade 
 Henry Sweet
 Nikolai Trubetzkoy
 Richard Wiese
 Moira Yip
 Elizabeth Zsiga
 
Phonol